Grafton is a village in Lorain County, Ohio, United States, along the East Branch of the Black River. The population was 6,636 at the 2010 census.  The Lorain Correctional Institution and several other prisons are located in and near Grafton.

History
Grafton was platted in 1846 when the railroad was extended to that point. The village's name may be a transfer from Grafton, Massachusetts.

Geography
Grafton is located at  (41.275919, -82.053154).

Demographics

2010 census
As of the census of 2010, there were 6,636 people, 965 households, and 726 families living in the village. The racial makeup of the village was 65.0% White, 32.7% African American, 0.2% Native American, 0.3% Asian, 1.2% from other races, and 0.7% from two or more races. Hispanic or Latino of any race were 2.3% of the population.

There were 965 households, of which 37.9% had children under the age of 18 living with them, 56.0% were married couples living together, 13.5% had a female householder with no husband present, 5.8% had a male householder with no wife present, and 24.8% were non-families. 20.1% of all households were made up of individuals, and 7.4% had someone living alone who was 65 years of age or older. The average household size was 2.68 and the average family size was 3.07.

The median age in the village was 36.2 years. 10.4% of residents were under the age of 18; 13.7% were between the ages of 18 and 24; 43.9% were from 25 to 44; 26.3% were from 45 to 64; and 5.6% were 65 years of age or older. The gender makeup of the village was 79.7% male and 20.3% female.

2000 census
As of the census of 2000, there were 2,302 people, 832 households, and 643 families living in the village. The population density was 510.0 people per square mile (197.1/km2). There were 853 housing units at an average density of 189.0 per square mile (73.0/km2). The racial makeup of the village was 97.83% White, 0.52% African American, 0.35% Native American, 0.26% Asian, 0.22% from other races, and 0.83% from two or more races. Hispanic or Latino of any race were 0.74% of the population.

There were 832 households, out of which 38.2% had children under the age of 18 living with them, 60.7% were married couples living together, 12.4% had a female householder with no husband present, and 22.6% were non-families. 19.4% of all households were made up of individuals, and 8.7% had someone living alone who was 65 years of age or older. The average household size was 2.77 and the average family size was 3.17.

In the village, the population was spread out, with 28.2% under the age of 18, 8.1% from 18 to 24, 30.5% from 25 to 44, 23.2% from 45 to 64, and 10.0% who were 65 years of age or older. The median age was 35 years. For every 100 females there were 93.6 males. For every 100 females age 18 and over, there were 90.4 males.

The median income for a household in the village was $52,446, and the median income for a family was $60,139. Males had a median income of $40,833 versus $26,732 for females. The per capita income for the village was $19,584. About 0.7% of families and 2.4% of the population were below the poverty line, including 1.8% of those under age 18 and 4.0% of those age 65 or over.

Notable people
 Ryan Feierabend, MLB player
 Ed McKean, MLB player
 Eric Lauer, MLB player

References

External links

Villages in Lorain County, Ohio
Villages in Ohio
Cleveland metropolitan area
Populated places established in 1846